The Yamaha DT 125 RE is a trail bike produced from 2004 to 2007 (some can have 2008 as the registration year).

The bike is a 125cc two-stroke single cylinder limited to 11 kW which makes it very popular for teens with an A1 license. 

It shares an engine with the DT125R, the Derbi GPR 125, the TZR125 and the TDR125.

Frame and plastics have been updated to be more durable and modern looking compared to the DT125 model.

References

DT125RE
Off-road motorcycles